Isabel Varell ( Wehrmann; born 31 July 1961) is a German singer, actress and television presenter.

Life 
Born in Kempen, Varell participated in various talent shows as a singer before she was discovered and supported by German producer Jack White in 1981. She released several singles in German and English language from 1981 on. From 1989 to 1991, she was married to German singer Drafi Deutscher. He also wrote her single Melodie d'amour with which she participated in the German preselection for the Eurovision Song Contest 1990 and finished sixth. Varell played in various musicals (e.g. Hammerfrauen from 2015 on in Berlin) and comedy TV shows, most notably alongside Hape Kerkeling. She has also presented TV shows for different broadcasters (Aktuelle Schaubude for NDR in 1997; Ganz in weiß for Sat.1 in 2016). From 2009 on she has written almost all the lyrics for her own albums as well as some for other artists such as Claudia Jung (Mein Plan für's nächste Leben, 2012).

Since 2008, Varell has lived together with television director Pit Weyrich whom she married in 2015. Her autobiographic book Mittlere Reife was published in April 2016.

Discography 

 1983: Baby Rock'n'Roll (LP)
 1999: Nur nicht aus Liebe weinen (CD)
 2002: Heut ist mein Tag (CD)
 2008: Königin der Nacht (CD)
 2009: Alles Ansichtssache (CD)
 2011: Alles neu (CD)
 2013: Da geht noch was (CD)

Singles (selection)
 1984: Verträumt
 1985: Die Sonne geht auf
 1986: Tonight
 1987: Golden Boy
 1988: The Spirit of the Heart
 1989: Indestructible Love
 1990: Melodie d'amour (written by Drafi Deutscher)
 1990: Geh nicht vorbei
 1991: There was a time (written by Jackie DeShannon)
 1993: Frauen, die lieben
 1994: Es gibt ein Danach
 1999: Kann denn Liebe Sünde sein? (with Hape Kerkeling)
 2002: Ich frier ohne dein Licht (co-written by Thomas Anders)
 2007: Bye Bye Baby
 2009: Nachts
 2011: Es ist nicht leicht Prinzessin zu sein (written by Stefan Zauner)
 2013: Da geht noch was
 2015: Ich habe Zeit (written by Stefan Zauner)
 2015: Verliebt ins Leben

Filmography 
 1985: Das Rätsel der Sandbank, as Clara Dollmann
 2004: Ich bin ein Star – Holt mich hier raus!
 2009–2010: Rote Rosen, as Andrea Weller
 2010–2011: Lena – Liebe meines Lebens, as Linda Behrendt
 2012: Rosamunde Pilcher – Der Fluch der weißen Tauben

Literature 
 2016: Mittlere Reife, Piper Verlag

References

External links 

 Official websitel
 
 

German stage actresses
German women singers
People from Viersen (district)
1961 births
Living people
German television actresses
20th-century German actresses
21st-century German actresses
Ich bin ein Star – Holt mich hier raus! participants
ZDF people
Norddeutscher Rundfunk people
Westdeutscher Rundfunk people